Elections to the Kyle and Carrick District Council took place in May 1992, alongside elections to the councils of Scotland's various other districts.

Aggregate results

References

Kyle
South Ayrshire Council elections